STV is a Scottish free-to-air public broadcast television channel owned and operated by the STV Group. It is made up of the Central Scotland and Northern Scotland Channel 3 public broadcaster licences, formerly known as Scottish Television (now legally STV Central Ltd) and Grampian Television (now legally STV North Ltd) respectively.

The STV brand refers to the on-air name used by Scottish Television for much of its history - notably in the 1970s and early 1980s. This brand remained in conversational use amongst the local public afterwards.

The modern STV brand was adopted on Tuesday 30 May 2006 replacing both franchises' previous identities. The sense of continuity in the name was demonstrated when STV celebrated its 60th birthday in 2017, with special programmes broadcast on STV itself and the now defunct STV2.

STV is now the only part of the Channel 3 network which is not owned by ITV plc. The station does not carry ITV1 branding or show ITV1's network presentation except between 6am and 9.25am, when it is replaced by the ITV-owned-and-branded national franchise ITV Breakfast.

History
On 2 March 2006, it was announced by SMG plc (now 'STV Group plc') that Scottish Television would revert to the brand name of 'STV', used from the start of colour broadcasting in 1969 until 30 August 1985, and which the station was still informally known as. At the same time, Grampian Television would also become known as STV North. The new-look branding was launched on 30 May 2006.

In January 2007, the station launched separate news services for the East and West of the STV Central region, initially as a five-minute opt out within the 6:00pm edition of Scotland Today on weeknights.

2010s
Regional news coverage was expanded again in May 2011 with the launch of separate half-hour editions of STV News at Six for the East and West, and localised late night news bulletins each weeknight.

STV were awarded local TV licences in January 2013 to operate two digital television channels in Glasgow and Edinburgh respectively, for up to 12 years. STV Glasgow launched on Monday, 2 June 2014 with an expanded schedule of local news, features and entertainment programming. STV Edinburgh launched on 12 January 2015. The two channels were later closed and merged with three other local TV licences to form a new national network, STV2, in April 2017. Existing regional news bulletins continue to air on the main STV Central service.

STV local channels
In 2013, STV won licences to launch local TV channels in Glasgow and Edinburgh. STV Glasgow launched on 2 June 2014, with STV Edinburgh following on 12 January 2015. From 24 April 2017, the city channels were rebranded as "STV2" and operated in combination with new franchises centred on Aberdeen, Dundee and Ayr. STV2 closed down in June 2018 as a result of oncoming competition from BBC Scotland.

Withdrawal of networked output
In July 2009, STV announced that it was withdrawing some networked programmes such as The Bill, Doc Martin, Midsomer Murders, Poirot, Lewis and a number of other high-profile ITV network dramas from its schedules, instead preferring to concentrate on programming made within Scotland. The practice of dropping networked shows had been in operation for other programmes since November 2008 when STV announced it would opt out of programmes they claimed were not performing well in their broadcast region, including Sharpe's Peril, Al Murray's Happy Hour, Moving Wallpaper, Benidorm and The Alan Titchmarsh Show. ITV's coverage of the FA Cup was also dropped.

ITV plc claimed that STV were in breach of their network agreements by making this decision and sued STV for £38 million. STV launched its own legal action against ITV plc, claiming the company was owed money and unhappy about promotional advertising of their services. The then executive chairman of ITV plc, Michael Grade claimed his company was the "victim" in the ongoing dispute.

Amid many protests, the company's chief executive Rob Woodward admitted in December 2009 that STV had made a 'major mistake' by dropping some of the networked dramas and replacing them in some cases with imported output, repeats and films. The company pledged to continue with its plan to produce more regional programming and opt out of networked output with further plans announced in August 2010.

On 27 April 2011, ITV plc and STV Group plc settled their legal dispute, with the former receiving £18 million from STV.
The £18 million consists of a £7.2 million cash payment payable in 2011 and £10.8 million either in programme rights at the end of the year or cash, as adjusted, depending on further discussions with ITV plc. The programming rights payment is capped at a maximum of £15 million. In addition, STV will receive £2.4 million of credit for programme opt outs in 2011. STV said it believed it was in the best interests of shareholders to end the long period of uncertainty. The parties have agreed the basis of a more collaborative relationship for the future.

In March 2012, a deal was announced between ITV and the other Channel 3 licence holders which would transform its commercial relationship with them after the broadcasters negotiated new Channel 3 networking arrangements. The deal would see STV and UTV become "affiliates" of the network, meaning they would pay an up-front fee for the rights to broadcast ITV content. At the time, the licence holders paid a percentage of the Channel 3 network costs based on their share of qualifying revenue. On 23 August 2012 STV confirmed the new network agreement with ITV was in operation.

Ofcom investigation
In March 2010, The Daily Telegraph reported that Ofcom would launch an investigation over claims that STV allowed the Scottish Government to influence its schedules and replace networked series with Scottish-based programmes. An Ofcom report released four months later cleared STV of allowing political interference within feature series, but 18 short social action programmes were found to have been influenced too closely by sponsorship from Government agencies and initiatives.

Programming
The two licences still produce regional programmes, although the only difference between them is the respective news programmes: STV News broadcasts separate bulletins to Northern Scotland (including an opt-out for the Tayside area), Glasgow/West Central Scotland, and Edinburgh/East Central Scotland. There is no "STV South" as Southern Scotland is part of the ITV Border region owned by ITV plc.

Emphasising the fact that STV is essentially one channel across the two regions, there is a single director of channels (Bobby Hain – former managing director of Scottish Television), and a single head of news (Gordon MacMillan – former head of news of Scottish TV). Terms in the renewed licences for both STV Central and STV North also mean that regional non-news programmes are shared (and identically scheduled) across both licences.

Although the stations are only required to produce 1.5 hours a week of regional non-news programmes (a single arrangement covering both North and Central regions), the chief executive of STV Group, the stations have long aimed to deliver more output.

Today, news and current affairs forms the bulk of STV's regular programming on Channel 3, which includes the topical analysis programme Scotland Tonight. The company formerly produced many Gaelic programmes, some of which are now shown on the Gaelic-language channel, BBC Alba, including Speaking our Language and Machair. On a network scale, one of STV's most famous exports is the long-running crime drama Taggart, set in Glasgow.

News
STV News at Six (2009–present)

Current affairs
Scotland Tonight (2011–present)

Sport
Scotsport (1957–2008)
STV Rugby (2009–2012)
STV Sports Centre (2010–2011)

Features and documentaries
The Five Thirty Show (2008–09)
The Hour (2009–11)

Entertainment
 Catchphrase (2013–present)
 Postcode Challenge (2007–2011)
 Moviejuice (2000–present)
 The Cash Machine (2019)

Kids
wknd@stv (2009)

Studios

STV Central
The STV studios in Glasgow were originally located in the former Theatre Royal in the Cowcaddens area of the city. The first programme broadcast by STV from the Theatre Royal studios was This is Scotland on 31 August 1957. In 1974, the company sold the Theatre Royal to Scottish Opera for conversion back to a full theatre and national opera house and moved into custom-built studios next door. The association with Cowcaddens ended in July 2006 when the station moved to new, smaller studios in Pacific Quay, alongside the Glasgow Science Centre.

In Edinburgh, STV converted the Gateway Theatre in Leith Walk into colour studios during the mid-late 1960s – a facility which proved especially useful in 1969 when a fire gutted studio A at the Theatre Royal, killing two firemen. The Edinburgh studios later became a permanent production centre for Take the High Road before being closed in the early 1990s to save costs. STV's Edinburgh base now consists of smaller studios for local news and advertising operations. In April 2012, the Edinburgh operation was moved from George Street in the city centre to a new studio at Fountainbridge.

STV North
STV North's Aberdeen headquarters moved to new smaller studios in the city's Tullos area in June 2003, vacating a converted tram depot that had been used since Grampian Television's launch in September 1961. Expansions to the Queen's Cross complex were made in 1983 and 1987 – the former as part of a £5 million investment into the company's technical facilities.

Around the time of the station's launch, Grampian also established premises in Dundee, later moving to Albany House in 1980 and Harbour Chambers in 1998. In April 2008, a new Dundee studio for local news and advertising operations was opened in the Seabraes area of the city.

Grampian opened a base for local Highlands & Islands newsgathering in Inverness in 1983, situated in Huntly Street, which has since re-located to Stoneyfield Business Park. A studio complex in Stornoway was opened in 1993 to accommodate the expansion of the station's Scots Gaelic programming production. The studios closed in 2000 following the axing of the Gaelic news service, Telefios, but are now part of MG Alba which took over the site as its headquarters.

Grampian also established secondary studios in Edinburgh during the late 1960s from where some of the station's light entertainment programming was produced. The studios were closed in 1969.

Subsidiary channels

STV HD
On 21 April 2010, STV Group plc. announced their intention to launch an HD channel on digital TV, before the 2010 World Cup. The station launched on 6 June 2010, initially broadcasting on Freeview channel 51, from the Black Hill, Keelylang Hill and Bressay transmitters, and now broadcasts from all post-digital switchover transmitters in its coverage area. STV HD was also made available on Virgin Media channel 113 in STV's transmission area soon after the launch of Freeview. The channel follows the launch of ITV1 HD, which became available on 2 April 2010 to viewers in the Scottish borders (who are served by ITV Border), England and Wales. STV Group plc. had been in talks with BSkyB, Freesat and the ITV Network with a view to making STV HD available via Sky and Freesat soon after the channels' initial launch. A test version of the channel was available free-to-air via satellite, but had to be manually tuned as it was not included on either the Sky or Freesat EPGs.

In September 2013, STV announced via Twitter that STV HD will be available for the first time on the Sky and Freesat from April 2014, nearly four years after first launching the channel on Freeview and Virgin Media. STV HD was added to Freesat and Sky on 28 April 2014.

Currently, STV HD is delivered across four transmission areas: North, West, East and Tayside. Only the Western region is broadcast Free-to-Air, the other three are Free-to-View and encrypted, and require a Viewing Card to watch them.

STV +1
On 4 January 2011, Freeview announced details for the launch of ITV1 +1, together with the possibility that both STV and UTV would launch their own timeshift services, STV +1 and UTV +1 in Scotland and Northern Ireland respectively. STV later confirmed that it would launch STV +1 at 8 pm on 11 January 2011. The channel is available to Freeview viewers on channel 35 and Virgin Media cable customers on channel 114.

The timeshift channel STV +1 has been replaced with the micro Channel 3 region serving the Dundee area on satellite. STV +1 had been available on satellite till then, but not carried on either Sky EPG or Freesat channel guides.

There are two regional variations of STV +1 on Freeview and Virgin.  One for North and one for Central Scotland. The North service shows Aberdeen-based news and commercials and the Central service carries the West region news bulletins and commercials.  The Edinburgh news programme is substituted in the evening on the Central +1 service.

STV +1 is available to stream on STV Player on various platforms.

Regions 

STV serves central and northern Scotland. Within STV, Scotland is split into two regions and four sub-regions. Networked and regional programming is the same in both regions, apart from regional news and advertising. Within both regions, there are further opt-outs providing sub-regional news and commercials.

STV North (formerly Grampian Television) is based in Aberdeen and serves Northern Scotland. The main news programme serving the area is the North edition of STV News at Six, alongside short regional bulletins (STV News/Good Morning Scotland) on weekdays. The main 6 pm programme on weeknights includes local opt-outs from Aberdeen (serving the North East and Highlands and Islands) and Dundee (serving Tayside and North East Fife). The two sub-regions also receive separate commercials.

STV Central (formerly Scottish Television) is based at the STV Group headquarters in Glasgow and serves Central Scotland. 
Two editions of STV News at Six are produced and broadcast each weeknight from Edinburgh (for Fife, the Lothians and parts of Central Scotland), and Glasgow (for western parts of Central Scotland and Lochaber). The two sub-regions also receive separate late night news bulletins and local commercials. Lunchtime bulletins are broadcast from Glasgow across the Central region – the Glasgow newsroom also produces pan-regional bulletins for the North and Central regions at weekends.

Altogether, the regions and sub-regions serve a population of 4,993,590.
STV North (pop: 1,309,110):
STV Aberdeen (pop: 827,390) – Aberdeen, Aberdeenshire, Highland (except Lochaber), Moray, na h-Eileanan Siar, Orkney and Shetland
STV Dundee (pop: 481,720) – Angus, Dundee, North East Fife, Perth and Kinross
STV Central (pop: 3,684,480):
STV Edinburgh (pop: 1,191,030) – Clackmannanshire, East Lothian, Edinburgh, Fife (except North East Fife), Midlothian and West Lothian
STV Glasgow (pop: 2,493,450) – Argyll and Bute, East Ayrshire, East Dunbartonshire, East Renfrewshire, Falkirk, Glasgow, Inverclyde, Lochaber, North Ayrshire, North Lanarkshire, Renfrewshire, Stirling, South Ayrshire, South Lanarkshire, West Dunbartonshire.
The areas of Dumfries and Galloway and the Scottish Borders are currently served by ITV Border.

Presentation

2006
The celebrity look remained until 2006, when the Scottish and Grampian names were traded in for one unified look: STV. The first ident package featured an elongated blue 'S', with scenes of Scottish people in various locations passing around the 'S' from person to person in differing scenes, until one person places the S in the centre of the screen.

2009
An updated look was introduced on 23 March 2009, consisting of a picture postcard scene which would flip over to the right to reveal another theme. This flipping increases in pace and as the camera pulls back before the STV logo forms against a gradient blue background.

2014
On 2 June 2014, STV's logo was given a slight update. The logo is now 3D, and the white "tv" is now situated on a gradient blue triangle while light blue curves appear on the 3 sides. The "S" colour was changed to gradient light blue.

Online presence 
stv.tv was first launched in May 2006, with the merger of Scottish TV and Grampian TV, both becoming "STV". The first incarnation of the website was simply the old Scottish TV website with the new STV logo and some new colours, whilst work was ongoing behind the scenes to launch a brand-new site, with new features.

Website builder, Dog Digital helped launch the new-look site in July 2006, with the aim of being Scotland’s main source of online information and entertainment, targeting a wide Scottish audience, with a younger market bias. Dog's remit had been to devise, deliver and develop a strategic digital marketing plan for the new online channel, including the design and integration of the new brand, navigation, and digital marketing in the form of a sizeable online campaign which would be activated to raise awareness of the new online channel. Along with the expected News, Sport, Weather and Programme pages, the site also had other stand-alone sections: stvbingo.tv, stvdate.tv and stvout.tv. STV later took interest in other classified sites, including money-saving and consumer website, PeoplesChampion.com and SmartyCars.com, a car-selling and motoring site. All of these stand-alone sites would later close, one by one.

STV began overhauling the website in August 2008, with the launch of their online catch-up service, stv.tv/video, developed by online video specialists, Brightcove. Over the coming months, the various sections of the site were updated with the new layout, and more programme pages were created, including for shows from the ITV Network.

In early 2009. STV launched its new online classified recruitment service, stvjobs.com. The site was supported by a multi-million pound media campaign including TV, Radio, Cinema, Online, Direct and Outdoor Advertising. The website closed in 2013.

In July 2009, the Video section of the site was relaunched as "STV Player", with added functionality, including parental controls and TV schedules.

STV Casino, in partnership with NetPlay TV, was launched on air and online in September 2009, and closed February 2010. The following year, STV launched another casino website, STV Live Casino in July 2011. This site was also closed down.

STV Holidays was launched in 2011, in partnership with Barrhead Travel. The website would later be rebranded as "ScottishPassport.com", to accompany the STV series, before closing down altogether.

STV Local, an initiative which aimed to create a network of hyper-local websites across Scotland, was launched in June 2011. The first areas to launch were Airdrie, Bellshill, Coatbridge, Cumbernauld, Motherwell and Wishaw. The service was rolled out across the whole of Scotland over the following two years. The local services were closed in July 2013, before the launch of dedicated websites for the cities of Aberdeen, Dundee, Edinburgh and Glasgow later that year. The initiative was then quietly dropped, with the City websites redirecting to their relevant sections of the STV News website.

In October 2016, after the success of the STV Children's Appeal, the company launched The Scottish Children’s Lottery. The Scottish Children’s Lottery operated independently of STV in accordance with the requirements of the licences from the UK Gambling Commission. The lottery was sold to MBC ELM Limited in 2021. 

In mid-2017, STV Player was made the homepage of stv.tv, with the small News and Competitions sections on the homepage removed, with just a link to those pages at the header and footer of the page.

See also

Television in Scotland
Scottish Broadcasting Commission
Sky Scottish
S2
STV2
 The current Channel 3 services in the rest of the United Kingdom:
ITV1
UTV

Notes

References

External links
STV
STV Group plc

2006 in Scotland
Mass media in Glasgow
ITV (TV network)
Scottish brands
STV Group
Television channels and stations established in 2006
Television channels in Scotland
Television series by STV Studios